The 1931 Rutgers Queensmen football team represented Rutgers University in the 1931 college football season. In their first season under head coach J. Wilder Tasker, the Queensmen compiled a 4–3–1 record and outscored their opponents 111 to 100.

Schedule

References

Rutgers
Rutgers Scarlet Knights football seasons
Rutgers Queensmen football